The Vizhaikha is a river in Perm Krai, Russia, a left tributary of the Vishera, which in turn is a tributary of the Kama. Its mouth is located in the town of Krasnovishersk.

References 

Rivers of Perm Krai